Great Valley Grasslands State Park is a state park of California, United States, preserving a parcel of remnant native grassland in the San Joaquin Valley. Such a temperate grasslands, savannas, and shrublands biome was once widespread throughout the whole Central Valley.  The  park was established in 1982.  Largely undeveloped, it was formed by combining two former state park units: San Luis Island and Fremont Ford State Recreation Area.  Its chief attractions for visitors are spring wildflowers, fishing, and wildlife watching.

Grassland Ecological Area
The park is part of the larger Grasslands Ecological Area (GEA) of federal, state and private lands all managed for wildlife refuge values. The GEA represents the largest remaining contiguous habitat block of wetlands remaining in all California.  The GEA is north of the Grasslands Wildlife Management Area.

Flora and fauna

Several rare and endangered species inhabit the park. 
In the grasslands habitat and plant community they include:
Alkali sacaton (Sporobolus airoides) — a native California bunchgrass
Delta button celery (Eryngium racemosum) —  an endemic and state-listed endangered species
In the flood plain of the San Joaquin River and in vernal pools, from biologists' reports, they include:
California Tiger salamander (Ambystoma californiense) — an amphibian endemic to Northern California, a listed vulnerable species
Vernal pool fairy shrimp (Branchinecta lynchi) — a fairy shrimp endemic to the vernal pools of Oregon and California, a listed endangered species
San Joaquin tadpole shrimp (Lepidurus packardi) — a tadpole shrimp endemic to California, endangered because of its limited distribution and habitat destruction

Proposal for closure
Great Valley Grasslands State Park was one of 48 California state parks proposed for closure in January 2008 as part of a deficit reduction program.  Those closures were ultimately avoided by cutting hours and maintenance system-wide.

See also
List of California native plants
List of California state parks
List of protected grasslands of North America

References

External links 
Great Valley Grasslands State Park

1982 establishments in California
Grasslands of California
Natural history of the Central Valley (California)
Parks in Merced County, California
Parks in the San Joaquin Valley
Protected areas established in 1982
State parks of California